Bahudari (pronounced bahudāri) is a rāgam in Carnatic music (musical scale of South Indian classical music). It is a derived scale (janya rāgam), as it does not have all the seven swaras (musical notes), derived from the 28th Melakarta raga Harikambhoji.

Structure and Lakshana 

Bahudari is an asymmetric scale that does not contain rishabham. It is called a shadava-audava rāgam, in Carnatic music classification (as it has 6 notes in ascending and 5 notes in descending scale). Its  structure is as follows (see swaras in Carnatic music for details on below notation and terms):

 : 
 : 

This scale uses the notes shadjam, antara gandharam, shuddha madhyamam, panchamam, chathusruthi dhaivatham and kaisiki nishadam.

Popular compositions 
Bahudari is a melodious rāgam. Here are some popular compositions in Bahudari.

Brova Bharama composed by Thyagaraja
Marakoti sundari and Unnadiye gatiyendru by G. N. Balasubramaniam
Sadananda tandavam seyyum by Achutadasar
Bhaja Manasa vighneswaram  composed by Thulaseevanam
Sinamadaiyade Seerividade composed by Dandapani Desikar
Sakala Shanti Karamu Sarvesha - tuned by Mahavidwan Sri Nedunuri Krishnamurty composed by Annamacharya
 ' Kamaladalayatha lochana ' by Dr M. Balamuralikrishna.
Mahâ Venkateshwarâ by Kalyani Varadarajan
Irabeku Hari Dasara by Purandaradasa
Indu sairisiri by Kanakadasa

Film Songs

Language:Tamil

Notes

References

Janya ragas